Kym Gyngell (born 15 April 1952), sometimes also credited as Kim Gyngell, is an Australian comedian and film, television and stage actor. Gyngell won the Australian Film Institute Award for Best Actor in a Supporting Role in 1988 for his role as Ian McKenzie in Boulevard of Broken Dreams.

Career

Television
In the late 1980s and early 1990s, he appeared in The Comedy Company and developed several popular characters, a few of which survived beyond The Comedy Company. One of his characters, Col'n Carpenter (who neglects to pronounce the letter 'i' in his name Colin), is a slow Australian with unique speech mannerisms. Col'n went on to have his own sitcom that ran for two seasons, in the early 1990s.

Also in the early 1990s, Gyngell appeared (as Carpenter) in a series of public service announcements for the Alcohol Advisory Council of New Zealand.

Gyngell was a regular on the popular Australian series Full Frontal during the mid-1990s, where he starred alongside Eric Bana before Bana attained Hollywood fame. His most notable characters included; "Leon" (Art critic who used to show up on talk shows and say the word "Crap"); and as characters sending up Kerry O'Brien (host of the ABC's The 7.30 Report) and John Laws (former 2UE radio broadcaster).

Once he left Full Frontal, he had a few guest roles, including comedy programs The Micallef Program and Pizza, and on drama series The Secret Life of Us, CrashBurn and Love My Way.

Since 2007, Gyngell played Father Harris on the ABC comedy The Librarians.

In 2008, Gyngell had a role in Underbelly for the Nine Network and also in ABC1's comedy Very Small Business.

In 2010, he had a role in the TV series Lowdown. In 2012, Gyngell played Paddy the Montebello family's shady accountant in The Straits. Both aired on ABC1.

Film
In 1985, Gyngell starred in his first film Wills & Burke playing William John Wills. In 1988, he played Ian McKenzie in Boulevard of Broken Dreams, which earned him an AFI award for Best actor. In 1988, he appeared in Bachelor Girl (1988) and in Grievous Bodily Harm. In 1990, he was in What the Moon Saw, and starred in Heaven Tonight which earned him an AFI nomination.

In 2000, he starred in the surprise hit of the year, the comedy The Wog Boy, playing the Supervisor; In 2002, he played the character of Paul in The Hard Word and as Richard in Blow.

In 2005, he was in The Writer.

Film awards
Gyngell received an AFI award in 1988 for "Best Actor in a Supporting Role" for his role in Boulevard of Broken Dreams which starred John Waters who won the AFI Best Actor award; Gyngell was also nominated for his performance in Heaven Tonight (1990). In 2005 Gyngell won the Best Actor award at the St Kilda Film Festival for his role in The Writer.

Theatre
Gyngell played with various theatre collectives in the early 1970s, such as La Mama, The Pram Factory, Hoopla (the predecessor of the Malthouse Theatre, Melbourne). In the late 1970s, he performed with the Sydney Theatre Company. In 2003, Gyngell played Robert in a production of David Auburn's play Proof. In 2008 Gyngell played William in the two-hander Ninety by Joanna Murray-Smith at the Melbourne Theatre Company (MTC); Later that year he played Tartuffe in Molière's The Hypocrite at the MTC opposite Marina Prior and Garry McDonald. In 2012, Gyngell performed in Sydney Theatre Company's production of Pygmalion.

Personal life
His second cousin is the former CEO of the Nine Network, David Gyngell, and his older brother is former diplomat and Office of National Assessments head Allan Gyngell.

Selected works

Le Club Foote: Music
Gyngell played keyboards in the Melbourne band Le Club Foote, who released their only album Cinema Qua in 1984, along with a couple of singles. The album was produced by Colin Hay of the band Men at Work.

Albums

Singles

Television
 Kaboodle (1986) – Magic Mirror in the episode Snow White and the Dreadful Dwarves (Series 1)
 The Comedy Company (1988–89) – Col'n Carpenter
 Col'n Carpenter (1990–91) – Col'n Carpenter
 Full Frontal (1993–97) – various characters
 "Greed" by Joanna Murray-Smith, episode in The Seven Deadly Sins for ABC Television (1993)
 Fire (1995) – Jimmy Runyon
 The Micallef Program (1999) – Various Characters
 Pizza
 The Secret Life of Us (2003) – Dr. Vander
 Love My Way (2007)
 Wilfred (2007) – Dr. Jack Underwood
 The Librarians (2007) – Father Harris
 Underbelly (2008) – Keith Faure
 Very Small Business (2008) – Ray Leonard
 Lowdown (2010) – Howard Evans
 The Straits (2012) – Paddy
 Rake (2016) – Reggie

Films
 Wills & Burke (1985) – William John Wills
 Just Us (1986) – The Mouth
 With Love to the Person Next to Me (1987) – Wallace
 Evil Angels (A Cry in the Dark) (1988) – Actor
 Boulevard of Broken Dreams (1988) – Ian McKenzie
 Bachelor Girl (1988) – Karl Stanton
 Grievous Bodily Harm (1988) – Mick
 What the Moon Saw (1990) – Jim Shilling
 Heaven Tonight (1990) – Baz Schultz
 The Making of Nothing (1993) – Davo
 Love and Other Catastrophes (1996) – Professor Leech
 The Wog Boy (2000) – Supervisor
 The Hard Word (2002) – Paul
 Blow (2002) – Richard
 Josh Jarman (2004) – Stan Billows
 The Writer (2005) – Jonathan
 The Little Death (2014) – Steve
 Bleeding Steel (2017) – Dr. James
 Brothers' Nest (2018) – Rodger

On stage
Proof (2003) – Robert
Ninety (2008/2009) – William
The Hypocrite (2008) – Tartuffe

References

External links

Kym Gyngell family tree
"Profile – Kim Gyngell" by Amanda Zachariah, Geelong Advertiser (26 September 2008)
"The Hypocrite – Melbourne Theatre Company" by Carol Middleton, Australian Stage Online (14 November 2008)

1952 births
Australian male comedians
Australian male film actors
Australian male television actors
Australian male stage actors
Comedians from Melbourne
Male actors from Melbourne
Living people
Best Supporting Actor AACTA Award winners